Uckfield College (formerly Uckfield Community Technology College) is a community college situated in Uckfield, UK. It has approximately 1,720 students, including 370 in the sixth form college. The current principal is Hugh Hennebry, who joined the college in 2008.

Inspections by Ofsted

As of 2022, the college's most recent full inspection by Ofsted was in 2013, with a judgement of Good. A short inspection in 2017 confirmed this judgement.

School activities

The college runs a number of educational and cultural events, including an annual Model United Nations known as "MUNGA" (Model United Nations General Assembly), international group trips, and local student drama and music performances.

Previous headteachers
Past Headteachers are: Craig Pamphilon 1999 to 2008, David Rebbitt 1977 to 1999, Malcolm Elliman 1974 to 1977 and Harold Pearmain 1953 to 1974.

Notable former pupils
 Rory Graham, better known as Rag'n'Bone Man
 Ed Tullett, also known as Lowswimmer, songwriter/producer
 Suzanne Dando, gymnast

References

External links
 School website
 East Sussex County Council Schools
 League Table (2007)

Secondary schools in East Sussex
Community schools in East Sussex
Uckfield